Gigi is a 1958 American musical romantic comedy film directed by Vincente Minnelli and processed using Metro-Goldwyn-Mayer's Eastmancolor film process Metrocolor. The screenplay by Alan Jay Lerner is based on the 1944 novella of the same name by Colette. The film features songs with lyrics by Lerner and music by Frederick Loewe, arranged and conducted by André Previn. Costume design was done by Cecil Beaton (hats by Madame Paulette).

At the 31st Academy Awards, the film won all nine of its nominations, including Best Picture and Best Director for Minnelli. It held the record for the highest clean sweep of nominations (later shared with The Last Emperor) until The Lord of the Rings: The Return of the King won all eleven of its nominations at the 76th Academy Awards in 2004.

In 1991, Gigi was selected for preservation in the United States National Film Registry by the Library of Congress as being "culturally, historically, or aesthetically significant". The American Film Institute ranked it number 35 in AFI's 100 Years...100 Passions. The film is considered the last great Metro-Goldwyn-Mayer musical and the final great achievement of the Freed Unit, headed by producer Arthur Freed.

Plot
The film is set during the Belle Époque at the turn of the 20th century. While in Bois de Boulogne, Honoré Lachaille remarks that in Paris, marriage is not the sole option for wealthy young bon vivants like his nephew Gaston, who is bored with life. Gaston does enjoy spending time with Madame Alvarez and her granddaughter, the precocious, carefree Gilberte, affectionately known as Gigi. Gigi's mother (a singer who is heard but never seen onscreen) leaves her care mostly to Madame Alvarez.

Following the "family tradition", Madame Alvarez regularly sends Gigi to her sister, Alicia (Gigi's great-aunt) to be groomed as a courtesan, which is a more dignified euphemism for a wealthy man's mistress. She learns proper etiquette and charm, but Gigi disdains the trivial love between a man and his mistress. She prefers having fun with Gaston, whom she regards as an older brother.

Like his uncle, Gaston is a known wealthy womanizer in Parisian high society. When his latest mistress has an affair with her ice skating instructor, Gaston publicly humiliates her, resulting in her faux-attempted suicide. Gaston plans to retreat to the country, but his uncle insists he remain in Paris and attend even more parties.

While playing cards with Gaston, Gigi wagers that if he loses, he must take her and her grandmother to the seaside for the weekend. Gaston agrees, loses the bet, and the three travel to Trouville. While Gaston and Gigi have fun together, Honoré and Madame Alvarez unexpectedly reunite and reminisce about their once-passionate affair. As other women at the resort hold perfect poise with an air of boredom or disdain for anything unfamiliar, Gigi pulls Gaston out of his depressive rut with her carefree attitude.

When Gaston goes to Monte Carlo, great-aunt Alicia and Madame Alvarez scheme to turn Gigi into Gaston's mistress. Though initially dubious, Madame Alvarez agrees to Gigi being intensively trained before Gaston's return. Gigi accepts this as pre-destined.

When Gaston returns, he is discomfited when Gigi shows off her new womanly gown. Gaston insults the dress, preferring her juvenile outfits; Gigi mocks his taste in clothes. Offended, Gaston storms out, then quickly realizes his folly and returns to apologize. He offers to take Gigi to tea at the Reservoir, but Madame Alvarez interjects, telling Gaston that an unchaperoned Gigi being seen in public with him could damage her reputation.

Angered, Gaston storms out again. He walks and reflects on Gigi, realizing he has developed a romantic desire for her. Although hesitant due to her young age, Gaston realizes that he loves Gigi. He wishes only to be near her—an unheard-of behavior between a man and his mistress. Despite such conventions, he proposes a generous "business arrangement" to Madame Alvarez and Aunt Alicia for Gigi to become his mistress. The women are overjoyed by his offer, though Gigi is not.

Gigi refuses, telling Gaston she does not seek celebrity status, only to eventually be abandoned by him and become another man's mistress. She wants their relationship to remain platonic, but when Gaston suddenly reveals that he loves her, Gigi bursts into tears. She chastises him, saying if he truly loved her, he would never expose her to a mistress's uncertain life. Gaston leaves dejected and is angry at Madame Alvarez, claiming she only emphasized the proposition's sordidness. He then speaks with Honoré, who says that Gigi's family has always been rather odd. Gigi later sends for Gaston and tells him that she would rather be miserable with him than without him, and agrees to the arrangement. When Gaston arrives for their first social outing, he is unexpectedly entranced by the transformed Gigi's elegant beauty.

The couple go to Maxim's restaurant. Gigi performs perfectly as his courtesan, which only upsets Gaston. After presenting her with an expensive diamond bracelet, he grows uneasy with the unrelenting scrutiny being heaped on them. Honoré delivers a crushing blow when he congratulates Gaston on his new courtesan and remarks that Gigi is so delightful that she will likely keep him amused for months.

Gaston, too in love with Gigi to subject her to an appalling life of uncertainty and social judgment, brusquely insists they leave. He drags Gigi up the stairs and into her grandmother's apartment. Sobbing hysterically, Gigi asks what she did wrong. Gaston leaves without answering, but realizing the depth of his love, soon returns. He asks Madame Alvarez for Gigi's hand in marriage. Gigi is overjoyed, as is her grandmother. 
                    
The final sequence returns to Honoré Lachaille, who proudly points out Gaston and Gigi getting into a carriage in the Bois de Boulogne: elegant, beautiful, and happily married.

Cast

Production

Development
Hollywood producer Arthur Freed first proposed a musicalization of the Colette novella to Alan Jay Lerner during the Philadelphia tryout of My Fair Lady in 1954. When Lerner arrived in Hollywood two years later, Freed was battling the Hays Code to bring his tale of a courtesan-in-training to the screen. Another roadblock to the project was the fact Colette's widower had sold the rights to her novella to Gilbert Miller, who planned to produce a film version of the 1954 stage adaptation by Anita Loos. It cost Freed more than $87,000 to purchase the rights from Miller and Loos.

Lerner's songwriting partner Frederick Loewe had expressed no interest in working in Hollywood, so Lerner agreed to write the screenplay only. He and Freed discussed casting; Lerner favored Audrey Hepburn, who had starred in the Broadway production written by Loos, but Freed preferred 
MGM contract star Leslie Caron, who had co-starred in An American in Paris for him. Both agreed Maurice Chevalier would be ideal for aging boulevardier Honoré Lachaille, and Lerner proposed Dirk Bogarde for Gaston. Lerner agreed to write the lyrics if Freed could convince Bogarde and designer Cecil Beaton to join the project. He decided to approach Loewe once again, and when he suggested they compose the score in Paris, Loewe agreed.

In March 1957, the duo began working in Paris. When Chevalier, who already had agreed to appear in the film, first heard "Thank Heaven for Little Girls", he was delighted. When he discussed his waning interest in wine and women in favor of performing for an audience in cabarets, Chevalier inadvertently inspired the creation of another tune for his character, "I'm Glad I'm Not Young Anymore". The lyrics for another of his songs, the duet "I Remember It Well", performed with Hermione Gingold as his former love Madame Alvarez, were adapted from words Lerner had written for Love Life, a 1948 collaboration with Kurt Weill. "Say a Prayer for Me Tonight", a solo performed by Gigi, had been written for Eliza Doolittle in My Fair Lady but was removed during the pre-Broadway run. Lerner disliked the melody, but Loewe, Freed, and Minnelli voted to include it in the film.

Casting

Lerner recalls that for the film Gigi, "The casting was so haphazard, I don't know how they ever got it on." He wrote the part of Honoré Lachaille for Chevalier, but the rest of the casting was still undecided. Having second thoughts about Audrey Hepburn, Freed asked Lerner to meet with her in Paris, but she declined the role. The producer then asked him to fly to London to speak to Leslie Caron, who was living there with her husband Peter Hall. Lerner was surprised to discover the star had become anglicized to the point of losing her French accent. She had recently starred in an unsuccessful stage production of Gigi, but when she heard Lerner's interpretation of the story greatly differed from that of the play, she accepted his offer. Her singing voice was dubbed by Betty Wand, though Caron filmed mainly to her own tracks (a brief clip of Caron's voice is heard in the DVD extras). Dirk Bogarde expressed interest, as well, but ultimately was unable to free himself from his contract with J. Arthur Rank. Recalling Louis Jourdan from his performance in Three Coins in the Fountain, Freed offered him the role of Gaston.

Filming
In late April, Freed and Minnelli and their entourages arrived in Paris. The weather had become unseasonably hot, and working in hotel rooms without air-conditioning was uncomfortable. Minnelli began scouting locations while Freed and Lerner discussed the still incomplete script. Lerner had taken liberties with Colette's novella; the character of Honoré, nonexistent in the original book and very minor in the Loos play, was now a major figure. Gigi's mother, originally a significant character, was reduced to a few lines of dialogue delivered off-screen. Lerner also expanded the focus on Gigi's relationship with her grandmother.

A signature scene was filmed on location at Maxim's, the famous Belle Epoque restaurant with its ornate Art Nouveau mirrored walls. Shooting at the restaurant was a logistical nightmare, as the mirrors reflected lighting equipment, the camera, and other undesirable behind-the-scenes artifacts. Minelli and cinematographer Joseph Ruttenberg worked together to come up with careful camera placements and a low-light visual scheme so that the location could be used without covering up the iconic mirrors. Ruttenberg even managed to cut down on the need for lighting stands and securing lights in corners by attaching lights with suction cups.

By mid-July, the composers had completed most of the score, but still were missing the title tune. Loewe was at the piano while Lerner was indisposed in the bathroom, and when the former began playing a melody the latter liked, he later recalled he jumped up, "[his] trousers still clinging to [his] ankles, and made his way to the living room. 'Play that again,' he said. And that melody ended up being the title song for Gigi."

In September, the cast and crew flew to California, where several interior scenes were filmed, among them the entire scene in Maxim's, which included a musical number by Jourdan. Lerner was unhappy with the look of the scene as it had been shot by Minnelli, so, at considerable expense, the restaurant was recreated on a soundstage and the scene was reshot by director Charles Walters, since Minnelli was overseas working on a new project.

The film title design uses the artwork of Sem's work from the Belle Époque.

Musical numbers 
 Overture – Played by MGM Studio Orchestra
 "Honoré's Soliloquy" – Sung by Maurice Chevalier
 "Thank Heaven for Little Girls" – Sung by Maurice Chevalier
 "It's a Bore" – Sung by Maurice Chevalier, Louis Jourdan and John Abbott
 "The Parisians" – Sung by Betty Wand
 "The Gossips" – Sung by Maurice Chevalier and MGM Studio Chorus
 "She is Not Thinking of Me" – Sung by Louis Jourdan
 "The Night They Invented Champagne" – Sung by Betty Wand, Hermione Gingold and Louis Jourdan
 "I Remember It Well" – Sung by Maurice Chevalier and Hermione Gingold
 "Gaston's Soliloquy" – Sung by Louis Jourdan
 "Gigi" – Sung by Louis Jourdan
 "I'm Glad I'm Not Young Anymore" – Sung by Maurice Chevalier
 "Say a Prayer for Me Tonight" – Sung by Betty Wand
 "Thank Heaven for Little Girls (Reprise)" – Sung by Maurice Chevalier and MGM Studio Chorus

The principal credited orchestrator was Conrad Salinger with vocal arrangements supervised by Robert Tucker. The conductor and general music supervisor was André Previn.

Release
Following completion of the film, it was previewed in Santa Barbara. Audience reaction was overwhelmingly favorable, but Lerner and Loewe were dissatisfied with the result. Lerner felt it was twenty minutes too long and most of the action too slow. The changes he proposed would cost an additional $300,000, money Freed was loath to spend. The songwriting team offered to buy 10% of the film for $300,000, then offered $3 million for the print. Impressed with their belief in the film, MGM executives agreed to the changes, which included eleven days of considerable reshooting, putting the project at $400,000 over budget. At a preview in Encino, audience reaction changed from "appreciation to affection", and Lerner felt the film finally was ready for release. It premiered at the Royale Theatre, a legitimate theatrical venue in New York City, on May 15, 1958.

The film entered saturation release in the United States with 450 prints on April 1, 1959.

Reception

Box office
According to MGM records, the film earned $6.5 million in the US and Canada and $3.2 million elsewhere during its initial theatrical release, resulting in a profit of $1,983,000. It was Freed's last and largest grossing success.

In total, the film grossed $13,208,725 in its initial release and later 1966 re-release.

Critical reception
In the 1959 review for Sight & Sound, David Vaughan calls Gigi "an elegant film" with a "cultivated visual taste [which] is everywhere apparent". He summarizes that "while Gigi does not represent a revival of the MGM musical in its heyday, it is a welcome extension of latter-day musical style in its adult subject-matter and its avoidance of spectacle made vulgar by emphasis on size." He praises Minnelli's talent for "the delicious amorality of the anecdote, but also the honesty and irony of its telling [which] have become foreign to the American cinema." Vaughan points out "Chevalier's practiced but irresistible charm [as] one of the film's greatest assets" as well as "the brilliant high-comedy playing of Isabel Jeans, who as Aunt Alicia consummately portrays the distinction and beauty of a retired aristocrat of the demimonde."

Bosley Crowther of The New York Times called it "a musical film that bears such a basic resemblance to My Fair Lady that the authors may want to sue themselves". He added, "But don't think this point of resemblance is made in criticism of the film, for Gigi is a charming entertainment that can stand on its own two legs. It is not only a charming comprehension of the spicy confection of Colette, but it is also a lovely and lyrical enlargement upon that story's flavored mood and atmosphere ... Vincente Minnelli has marshaled a cast to give a set of performances that, for quality and harmony, are superb."

Abel Green of Variety called the film "100% escapist fare" and predicted it "is destined for a global box-office mop-up". He added, "Alan Jay Lerner's libretto is tailor-made for an inspired casting job for all principals, and Fritz Loewe's tunes (to Lerner's lyrics) already vie with and suggest their memorable My Fair Lady score... Miss Caron is completely captivating and convincing in the title role... Skillful casting, performance and presentation have endowed realism to the sum total... Director Minnelli's good taste in keeping it in bounds and the general sound judgment of all concerned...distinguishes this Arthur Freed independent production. The Metrocolor rates recognition for its soft pastels under Joseph Ruttenberg's lensing; the Beaton costumes, sets and general production design are vivid physical assets at first sight. The skillful integration of words-and-music with the plot motivation makes this Gigi a very fair lady indeed as a boxoffice entry."

Time Out New York said, "The dominating creative contribution comes from Minnelli and Cecil Beaton ... The combination of these two visual elitists is really too much—it's like a meal consisting of cheesecake, and one quickly longs for something solid and vulgar to weigh things down. No doubt inspired by the finicky, claustrophobic sets and bric-à-brac, the cast tries (with unfortunate success) to be more French than the French, especially Chevalier. The exception is Gingold, who inhabits, as always, a world of her own."

TV Guide rated the film 3½ out of five stars, calling it "Overbaked but enjoyable, and a banquet for the eyes, thanks to the visual wonder of the Minnelli-Beaton teaming... Caron...leads the cast in a contest to see who can be the most French. The winner is Chevalier, in a performance that makes one feel as if you're gagging on pastry... Perhaps if the sweetness of Gigi was contrasted with elements of honest vulgarity, the picture could balance itself out... Ten minutes into the movie, you've resolved the plot and are left to wallow in lovely frou-frou. [The film] makes wonderful use of the usual Parisian landmarks, and benefits from extraordinary period costumes and sets."

On Rotten Tomatoes, the film holds a rating of 88% from 72 reviews. The consensus summarizes: "It may not be one of Vincente Minnelli's best, but the charming and flawlessly acted Gigi still offers enough visual and musical treats to satisfy."

Awards and nominations
Gigi won a record-breaking nine Academy Awards (at the 1959 Oscars ceremony); however, this record only lasted for one year, as Ben-Hur broke this record the following year with 11 Oscars.  In tribute to Gigis domination of the Oscars, the MGM switchboard answered calls the following day with "M-Gigi-M". Gigi, eventually along with 1987's The Last Emperor, held the record as the film(s) with the most Academy Award wins in every category in which it was nominated, until 2003's The Lord of the Rings: The Return of the King broke the record at the 2004 Oscars ceremony with 11 Oscar nominations and 11 Oscar wins.

American Film Institute lists:
 AFI's 100 Years...100 Passions -#35
 AFI's 100 Years...100 Songs
Thank Heaven for Little Girls -#56

Digital restoration 
In about 2008, the film was digitally restored by Prasad Studios, which removed dirt, tears, scratches, and other defects frame by frame.

Popular culture
 Jazz trumpeter, bandleader and arranger Shorty Rogers released an album of Lerner and Loewe's music, Gigi in Jazz, in 1958.
 The album cover appears on the cover for Pink Floyd's Ummagumma (1969) album, designed by Storm Thorgerson. For the US/Canada and Australian releases the cover was airbrushed out because of fears of copyright infringement. The artwork was restored in the later CD releases in all territories.
 Edith Bouvier Beale (best known as "Little Edie") mentioned several times in the Maysles brothers 1975 documentary Grey Gardens that Gigi was "absolutely marvelous".
 In the book series, The Mother Daughter Book Club by Heather Vogel Frederick, the character Gigi gets her nickname from her love of the musical

See also
 List of American films of 1958

References

Bibliography

External links

 
 
 
 
 
 
 Gigi essay by Daniel Eagan in America's Film Legacy: The Authoritative Guide to the Landmark Movies in the National Film Registry, A&C Black, 2010 , pages 547-579

1958 films
1958 musical comedy films
1958 romantic comedy films
1950s romantic musical films
American musical comedy films
American romantic comedy films
American romantic musical films
Best Musical or Comedy Picture Golden Globe winners
Best Picture Academy Award winners
Films adapted into plays
Films awarded an Academy Honorary Award
Films based on French novels
Films based on romance novels
Films based on works by Colette
Films directed by Vincente Minnelli
Films featuring a Best Supporting Actress Golden Globe-winning performance
Films produced by Arthur Freed
Films scored by André Previn
Films scored by Frederick Loewe
Films set in Paris
Films set in the 1900s
Films that won the Best Costume Design Academy Award
Films that won the Best Original Score Academy Award
Films that won the Best Original Song Academy Award
Films whose art director won the Best Art Direction Academy Award
Films whose cinematographer won the Best Cinematography Academy Award
Films whose director won the Best Directing Academy Award
Films whose director won the Best Director Golden Globe
Films whose editor won the Best Film Editing Academy Award
Films whose writer won the Best Adapted Screenplay Academy Award
Films with screenplays by Alan Jay Lerner
Grammy Hall of Fame Award recipients
Metro-Goldwyn-Mayer films
Photoplay Awards film of the year winners
United States National Film Registry films
CinemaScope films
Belle Époque
1950s English-language films
1950s American films